Sabine Zimmermann (born 30 December 1960) is a German politician. Born in Pasewalk, Mecklenburg-Vorpommern, she represents The Left. She has served as a member of the Bundestag from the state of Saxony since 2005.

Life 
Zimmermann became a member of the Bundestag after the 2005 German federal election. She is a member of the Committee for Tourism, the Main Committee and the Committee for Family, Senior Citizens, Women and Youth.

References

External links 

  
 Bundestag biography 

1960 births
Living people
Members of the Bundestag for Saxony
Female members of the Bundestag
21st-century German women politicians
Members of the Bundestag 2017–2021
Members of the Bundestag 2013–2017
Members of the Bundestag 2009–2013
Members of the Bundestag 2005–2009
Members of the Bundestag for The Left